Sergio Santarini (born 10 September 1947) is a retired Italian professional football player and coach who played as a defender.

Club career
Throughout his career, Santarini played for Rimini, Internazionale, Roma, and Catanzaro, winning three Coppa Italia titles during his 13 years with Roma.

International career
At international level, Santarini represented the Italy national football team on two occasions between 1971 and 1974, scoring once.

Honours

Club
Roma
 Coppa Italia winner: 1968–69, 1979–80, 1980–81.

Individual
A.S. Roma Hall of Fame: 2015

References

External links
 

1947 births
Living people
Italian footballers
Italy international footballers
Serie A players
Serie C players
Rimini F.C. 1912 players
Inter Milan players
A.S. Roma players
U.S. Catanzaro 1929 players
Italian football managers
Association football defenders